Veletian County was a county of the District of the Western Pomerania, within the Republic of Poland. Its capital was Nowe Warpno. It existed from 4 October 1945 to 29 May 1946.

History 
It was established on 4 October 1945, from the western part of Ueckermünde District, that was part of the territory ceased to Poland, after the fall of Nazi Germany. The eastern part of the former Ueckermünde District was ceased to the Enclave of Police. The county stretched from the border of the Soviet occupation zone of Germany on the west, to the administrative boundaries of the city of Szczecin on the east. It was named after the tribe of Veleti, that inhabited the area from the 6th to 10th century. Nowe Warpno become the capital of the county. As the German population was subjected to the expulsion from Poland, the area was resettled with Polish population. As the county was located at the German border, it was reserved for the military settlement, which included demilitarised soldiers, and then their families, and people resettled from the Eastern Borderlands. The county existed until 29 May 1946, when it was incorporated into then-established Szczecin County.

Citations

Notes

References 

Former counties of Poland
History of Pomerania
States and territories established in 1945
States and territories disestablished in 1946
1945 establishments in Poland
1946 disestablishments in Poland
Police County